Melaleuca hollidayi is a plant in the myrtle family, Myrtaceae and is endemic to the south of Western Australia. It is a small shrub with fine hairs like spider web on its leaves, and bright pink flowers.

Description

The flowers are a shade of deep pink to purple, arranged in heads on the ends of branches which continue to grow after flowering and sometimes in the upper leaf axils. There are five bundles of stamens around the flower, each with 5 to 10 stamens.

Taxonomy and naming
Melaleuca hollidayi was first formally described in 1999 by Lyndley Craven in Australian Systematic Botany from a specimen collected near Scaddan. The specific epithet (hollidayi) honours Ivan Holliday, an Australian author of books about native plants who did much to promote the use of indigenous plants in cultivation, including Melaleuca species.

Distribution and habitat
Melaleuca hollidayi occurs in the Kalbarri and Mullewa districts in the Esperance Plains and Mallee biogeographic regions. It grows in sandy soils on sandplains in heath, often with Banksia species.

Conservation status
Melaleuca hollidayi is listed as "not threatened" by the Government of Western Australia Department of Parks and Wildlife.

References

hollidayi
Plants described in 1999
Endemic flora of Western Australia
Taxa named by Lyndley Craven